Zhao Guochun (born 7 August 1961) is a Chinese geologist and professor at the University of Hong Kong and Northwest University (China).

Education
Zhao was born in Xiuyan Manchu Autonomous County, Liaoning on August 7, 1961. He secondary studied at the High School of Xiuyan Manchu Autonomous County. In 1981 he studied, then taught, at what is now Jilin University. In 2000 he obtained his doctor's degree from Curtin University. From August 2000 to July 2002 he was a postdoctoral fellow at the University of Hong Kong.

Career
He taught at the University of Hong Kong since 2002, what he was promoted to associate professor in July 2007 and to full professor in July 2013.

Honours and awards
 2014 Fellow of the American Gem Society
 2014 State Natural Science Award (Second Class)  
 November 22, 2019 Member of the Chinese Academy of Sciences (CAS)

References

External links
Professor Zhao Guochun on the University of Hong Kong

1961 births
Living people
People from Xiuyan Manchu Autonomous County
Jilin University alumni
Curtin University alumni
Scientists from Liaoning
Chinese geologists
Academic staff of the Northwest University (China)
Academic staff of the University of Hong Kong
Members of the Chinese Academy of Sciences
Members of the Election Committee of Hong Kong, 2021–2026